Casei Gerola is a comune (municipality) in the Province of Pavia, Lombardy, Italy.

Casei Gerola borders the following municipalities: Castelnuovo Scrivia, Cornale e Bastida, Isola Sant'Antonio, Mezzana Bigli, Molino dei Torti, Pontecurone, Silvano Pietra, Voghera.

It was part of the Counties of Guastalla and, later, county of Montechiarugolo, both ruled by the Torelli family, until 1612. It remained to the Torelli until 1797.

Demographic evolution

References

Cities and towns in Lombardy